Otter Tail County is a county in the U.S. state of Minnesota. As of the 2020 census, its population was 60,081. Its county seat is Fergus Falls. Otter Tail County comprises the Fergus Falls micropolitan statistical area. With 1,048 lakes in its borders, Otter Tail County has more lakes than any other county in the United States.

History
Native Americans used the area for hunting and fishing, and had permanent dwelling sites. Two Native American tribes were in constant conflict. The Dakota (Sioux) were being pushed from their home area by the Ojibwa (Chippewa) during the late 18th and early 19th centuries. Burial mounds and artifacts can still be found. Some of the oldest Native American remains were found near Pelican Rapids, Minnesota. The remains, nicknamed Minnesota Girl, were dated at about 11,000 BC.

The first white men to enter the county were French and British fur traders. Efforts were made to set up trading posts on the Leaf Lakes and Otter Tail Lake. In the late 19th century, most of the towns were built along the railroad lines. Lumber and agriculture were the major industries in the county at that time. The pine and hardwood forests, transportation system, and markets were instrumental in the development of Fergus Falls into a lumber center. The Wisconsin Territory was established by the federal government effective July 3, 1836, and existed until its eastern portion was granted statehood (as Wisconsin) in 1848. The federal government set up the Minnesota Territory effective March 3, 1849. The newly organized territorial legislature created nine counties across the territory in October of that year. One of those original counties, Dakota, had a section partitioned off in 1851 to create Cass County. On March 18, 1858, the outgoing territorial legislature created Otter Tail County from areas partitioned from Cass and Pembina, another of the original counties created in 1849. The county was named for Otter Tail Lake and the Otter Tail River. The county was not organized in 1858, nor was a county seat specified. On September 12, 1868, the legislature completed the county organization, and specified Otter Tail City as county seat.
 
Otter Tail City began as a waystation on a fur-trade route between Saint Paul and the Red River valley. The settlement was of sufficient size that when the Minnesota Territory established a US land office for this part of the territory, the office was sited at Otter Tail City. Thus, the city was named as the seat when the county was organized, but people had begun settling the future Fergus Falls area in 1857, and it grew sufficiently that in fall 1872, the vote was taken to move the county seat there. The Northern Pacific Railroad had initially planned to run a line through Otter Tail City, but complications caused the line to be placed in Fergus Falls, which precipitated the county seat move. The Soo Line later made plans to run a line through Otter Tail City, but when townspeople could not agree on the routing, another route east of the city was constructed. Thus, a new city plat was generated, with the settlement name changing to Ottertail.

In 1870, the population of the county was about 2,000. At that time, the principal languages spoken in the county were Norwegian, Swedish, German, and English.

The people of Fergus Falls organized a new county named Holcomb. In 1872, a legislative act abolished Holcomb County, added additional townships to the west, and established Fergus Falls as Otter Tail County's seat.

Early telephone
The Fergus Falls Telephone Exchange Company organized on March 20, 1882, and was in a room at the First National Bank at the corner of Cascade and Lincoln. The system install was very crude. Efforts were made to have telephones installed in the courthouse but commissioners did not feel it was necessary. Eventually a telephone was installed in the auditor's office through a combination of private and public funds. A clerk in the office was tasked with tracking down the officer who was called. The business was sold to the Northwestern Telephone Exchange Company in 1883.

Geography
The Otter Tail River flows south and west through the central and western parts of the county on its way to form the Red River in Wilkin County. It is joined by the south-flowing Pelican River west of Fergus Falls. The Leaf River rises in the county and flows east to its confluence with the Crow Wing River in neighboring Wadena County. The Redeye River flows southeast through the county's northeast section toward its confluence with the Leaf in Wadena. The county terrain consists of rolling hills, heavily wooded through its center section, dotted with lakes and ponds, and carved with drainages and gullies. The available area is devoted to agriculture. The county terrain slopes to the west and south. The highest points on the county terrain are at two different locations: Inspiration Peak, at 1,727 ft (526 m), and Pekan Peak (unofficial name) a summit northeast of the village of Urbank in Folden Township, Section 32, at 1,800 ft (549 m) above sea level. Otter Tail is one of 17 Minnesota savanna region counties with more savanna soils than either forest or prairie soils. According to its website, the county contains over 1,000 lakes.

Transportation

Major Highways

Airports

 Aerovilla Airport - 2 miles (3 km) NW of Perham
 Battle Lake Municipal Airport - 1.6 mile (2.6 km) NNE of Battle Lake
 Fergus Falls Municipal Airport (FFM) - 3.8 miles (6.1 km) W of Fergus Falls
 Henning Municipal Airport (05Y) - 1.1 mile (1.8 km) S of Henning
 Pelican Rapids Municipal Airport (47Y) - 4.6 miles (7.4 km) NNW of Pelican Rapids
 Perham Municipal Airport (16D) - 1 mile (1.6 km) NW of Perham
 Wadena Municipal Airport (ADC) - 3.4 miles (5.5 km) W of Wadena

Adjacent counties

 Becker County - north
 Wadena County - northeast
 Todd County - southeast
 Douglas County - south
 Grant County - southwest
 Wilkin County - west
 Clay County - northwest

Protected areas

 Aastad State Wildlife Management Area
 Amor State Wildlife Management Area
 Bluff Creek State Wildlife Management Area
 Davies State Wildlife Management Area
 Dead Lake State Wildlife Management Area
 Doran State Wildlife Management Area
 Eagle Lake State Wildlife Management Area
 Eastern Township State Wildlife Management Area
 Elmo State Wildlife Management Area
 Folden Woods State Wildlife Management Area
 Glendalough State Park
 Hi-View State Wildlife Management Area
 Inman State Wildlife Management Area
 Inspiration Peak State Wayside Park
 Jensen Memorial State Wildlife Management Area
 Maplewood State Park
 Orwell State Wildlife Management Area
 Otter Tail Prairie Scientific and Natural Area
 Prairie Ridge State Wildlife Management Area
 Valdine State Wildlife Management Area

Demographics

2000 census

As of the 2000 United States census, there were 57,159 people, 22,671 households, and 15,779 families in the county. The population density was 29.0/sqmi (11.2/km2). There were 33,862 housing units at an average density of 17.2/sqmi (6.63/km2). The racial makeup of the county was 97.11% White, 0.29% African American, 0.51% Native American, 0.44% Asian, 0.05% Pacific Islander, 0.84% from other races, and 0.78% from two or more races. Hispanic or Latino of any race were 1.67% of the population. 35.5% were of German and 31.2% Norwegian ancestry.

There were 22,671 households, out of which 30.3% had children under the age of 18 living with them, 60.1% were married couples living together, 6.1% had a female householder with no husband present, and 30.4% were non-families. 26.6% of all households were made up of individuals, and 13.30% had someone living alone who was 65 years of age or older. The average household size was 2.46 and the average family size was 2.98.

The county population contained 24.9% under the age of 18, 7.2% from 18 to 24, 24.2% from 25 to 44, 24.7% from 45 to 64, and 19.0% who were 65 years of age or older. The median age was 41 years. For every 100 females there were 100.4 males. For every 100 females age 18 and over, there were 97.8 males.

The median income for a household in the county was $35,395, and the median income for a family was $42,740. Males had a median income of $30,151 versus $20,930 for females. The per capita income for the county was $18,014. About 6.7% of families and 10.1% of the population were below the poverty line, including 12.1% of those under age 18 and 11.1% of those age 65 or over.

2020 Census

Politics

Otter Tail is a Republican stronghold in U.S. presidential elections, having voted for the party's candidates in every election since 1936. The only Democrats to win the county since Minnesota became a state in 1858 have been Franklin D. Roosevelt in his first election victory, and unsuccessful candidate William Jennings Bryan in 1896.

During the Great Depression, there was a communist faction within the county. The areas where the movement was centered are quite desolate today, but in mid-1932 over 900 people were involved in one of the state's communist organizations at what was a historic low point for farmers. The members of the communist party were very active in the New York Mills area of Newton, Leaf Lake, Blowers, Deer Creek and Paddock Townships. They held meetings, recruited members, placed candidates on local and state tickets, and distributed propaganda. They held dances in Heinola, Menahga, and Sebeka where the Soviet hammer and sickle was proudly displayed and ran a summer camp on East Leaf Lake.

By the time Franklin Roosevelt implemented his New Deal programs in the county, the communist movement began to lose steam. In addition, the Winter War in Europe between Finland and the U.S.S.R. soured many Finnish immigrants on communism (Finns had been a large proportion of the local communists). Carl Peltoniemi, a former local communist, said, "The communist movement within the Finnish community basically ended at the start of the Winter War in 1939–1940."

In the Minnesota House of Representatives, Otter Tail County is divided into two districts, 8A and 8B. They are represented by Republicans Bud Nornes (8A) and Mary Franson (8B). Districts 8A and 8B make up Minnesota State Senate district 8, which is represented by Republican State Senator Bill Ingebrigtsen.

Communities

Cities

 Battle Lake
 Bluffton
 Clitherall
 Dalton
 Deer Creek
 Dent
 Elizabeth
 Erhard
 Fergus Falls (county seat)
 Henning
 New York Mills
 Ottertail
 Parkers Prairie
 Pelican Rapids
 Perham
 Richville
 Rothsay (part)
 Underwood
 Urbank
 Vergas
 Vining
 Wadena (part)

Unincorporated communities

 Butler
 Carlisle
 Dunvilla
 Heinola
 Luce
 Parkton
 Richdale
 Topelius
 Wall Lake
 Woodland Park
 Wrightstown

Townships

 Aastad Township
 Amor Township
 Aurdal Township
 Blowers Township
 Bluffton Township
 Buse Township
 Butler Township
 Candor Township
 Carlisle Township
 Clitherall Township
 Compton Township
 Corliss Township
 Dane Prairie Township
 Dead Lake Township
 Deer Creek Township
 Dora Township
 Dunn Township
 Eagle Lake Township
 Eastern Township
 Edna Township
 Effington Township
 Elizabeth Township
 Elmo Township
 Erhards Grove Township
 Everts Township
 Fergus Falls Township
 Folden Township
 Friberg Township
 Girard Township
 Gorman Township
 Henning Township
 Hobart Township
 Homestead Township
 Inman Township
 Leaf Lake Township
 Leaf Mountain Township
 Lida Township
 Maine Township
 Maplewood Township
 Newton Township
 Nidaros Township
 Norwegian Grove Township
 Oak Valley Township
 Orwell Township
 Oscar Township
 Otter Tail Township
 Otto Township
 Paddock Township
 Parkers Prairie Township
 Pelican Township
 Perham Township
 Pine Lake Township
 Rush Lake Township
 Scambler Township
 St. Olaf Township
 Star Lake Township
 Sverdrup Township
 Tordenskjold Township
 Trondhjem Township
 Tumuli Township
 Western Township
 Woodside Township

Education
School districts include:

 Ashby Public School District
 Barnesville Public School District
 Battle Lake Public School District
 Bertha-Hewitt Public School District
 Brandon-Evansville Public Schools
 Breckenridge Public School District
 Campbell-Tintah Public School District
 Detroit Lakes Public School District
 Fergus Falls Public School District
 Frazee-Vergas Public School District
 Henning Public School District
 Lake Park Audubon School District
 Menahga Public School District
 New York Mills Public School District
 Parkers Prairie Public School District
 Pelican Rapids Public School District
 Perham-Dent Public School District
 Rothsay Public School District
 Sebeka Public School District
 Underwood Public School District
 Wadena-Deer Creek School District
 West Central Area School District

See also
 National Register of Historic Places listings in Otter Tail County, Minnesota

References

External links

 Otter Tail Country Tourism Association
 Otter Tail County, Minnesota official government’s website
 Otter Tail County Historical Society

 
Minnesota counties
1868 establishments in Minnesota
Populated places established in 1868